Thomas A. DeVilbiss High School was a public high school in Toledo, Ohio from 1931 to June 1991.  It was part of the Toledo Public School District, serving students from the DeVeaux, Elmhurst, Grove Patterson, Longfellow, Mayfair, McKinley, Nathan Hale, Old Orchard, and Whittier elementary schools. The building still sits at 3301 Upton Avenue near the Central Avenue intersection.

The DeVilbiss Tigers were members of the Toledo City League and donned the colors of orange and black. On the contrary, the school colors were the colors of the rainbow, hence the yearbook being the Pot O' Gold, and the school newspaper/newsletter the Prism. Their main rivals were the Start Spartans, although rivalries existed with the St. Francis Knights and the Libbey Cowboys, whom they annually played football against on Thanksgiving day from 1933–1963.

In 1974 DeVilbiss received an obscure salute when 1965 alumnus, and then budding satirist P. J. O'Rourke, along with fellow Ohioan Doug Kenney, used the Pot O’ Gold and DeVilbiss as templates for the National Lampoon 1964 High School Yearbook Parody. That issue contains dozens of direct and indirect references to DeVilbiss and west Toledo. O’Rourke later said that they  “… used DeVilbiss because Ohio and Toledo and DHS just seemed so perfectly 1964 American prelapsarian typical…”  By “prelapsarian” he meant before the social and political unrest and violence that occurred in the intervening ten years.

Due to a declining enrollment and low finances, DeVilbiss was closed along with Macomber and Whitney high schools by TPS at the end of the 1990–1991 school year. The DeVilbiss district was split up so students could attend Bowsher, Rogers, Scott, or Start high schools.

The building has been renovated by Duket Architects and currently serves as Toledo Technology Academy, which opened in 1997.

DeVilbiss served as the home of Scott High School for two years while Scott's building underwent renovations from 2010–2012.

DeVilbiss' Page Stadium was fully torn down at the end of May 2012.

Ohio High School Athletic Association state championships

Boys Cross Country: 1970 Class AAA
Boys Golf: 1940, 1950
Boys Track & Field: 1946 (Class A), 1987 (Class AAA)

Toledo City League Championships

Baseball: 1935, 1936, 1937, 1940*, 1950, 1954*, 1957, 1962, 1964, 1980
Boys Basketball: 1934–35, 1935–36, 1943–44*, 1949–50, 1951–52*
Boys Cross Country: 1969, 1970, 1971, 1973, 1974, 1975, 1981
Girls Basketball: 1983–84
Girls Cross Country: 1984
Football: 1938*, 1953, 1954, 1955, 1957, 1958, 1959, 1961*, 1973, 1974, 1989
Boys Track & Field: 1933, 1942, 1943, 1944, 1945, 1946, 1947, 1949, 1951, 1954, 1981, 1982, 1987, 1988, 1989
Girls Track & Field: 1985, 1986, 1988, 1989
Volleyball: 1977, 1984, 1986
Chess: 1973, 1974, 1975
Golf: 1967
Tennis: 1962, 1963, 1964, 1967
(years marked with an asterisk (*) denote a shared title)

Notable alumni
Dusty Anderson actress and WWII-era pin up model 
Jerry Blanton (1974): football player who later starred at the University of Kentucky and then went on to play a long career in the NFL with the Kansas City Chiefs.
William Blinn (1955): screenwriter of Purple Rain (film), Roots (1977 miniseries), Fame (1982 TV series), Brian's Song and Eight Is Enough.
Bob Chappuis (1941): football player who later starred at the University of Michigan.
Terry Crosby (1975): basketball standout that played for the University of Tennessee and Kansas City Kings.
Jim Detwiler (1963): football standout who competed for the University of Michigan Wolverines.
Terry Harmon (1962/3): played baseball at Ohio University and for the Philadelphia Phillies.
Karen Harper (1963): author
Lyfe Jennings: R&B singer and songwriter
Brett Leonard (1977): film director and producer of The Lawnmower Man and Virtuosity; virtual reality and sci-fi tech pioneer
Jeremy Lincoln (1987): played football for the University of Tennessee and in the NFL for the Chicago Bears, St. Louis Rams, Seattle Seahawks, New York Giants, and the Detroit Lions.
Ron McDole (1957): played football for the University of Nebraska and in the NFL for the St. Louis Cardinals, Houston Oilers, Buffalo Bills, and the Washington Redskins.
Bob Meyer Former MLB player (Kansas City Athletics, New York Yankees, Los Angeles Angels, Seattle Pilots, Milwaukee Brewers)
P.J. O'Rourke (1965): political satirist, journalist, writer, and author.
Geoff Zahn (1964): baseball star for the University of Michigan and later played for the Los Angeles Dodgers, Chicago Cubs, Minnesota Twins, and California Angels.
Jack Zouhary (1969):  Federal Judge Northwest Ohio.
Jan Wahl (1948): author of over 100 bestselling children's books, historian of American literature and film.

References

External links
District Website
All-Time DeVilbiss City League Titles
Thomas A. DeVilbiss Facebook page
 https://web.archive.org/web/20090106041611/http://www.tigerroar.org/
 https://web.archive.org/web/20081204115209/http://www.dhs1960.com/

Defunct schools in Ohio
High schools in Toledo, Ohio
1931 establishments in Ohio
1991 disestablishments in Ohio